Film as a Subversive Art is a fully illustrated 1974 film history book by Amos Vogel with mini-essays on over 600 films.

Summary
The book was a catalogue of films that broke aesthetic, sexual and ideological boundaries.

Selected examples
Titicut Follies (1967)
The War Game (1965)
2 or 3 Things I Know About Her (1967)
W.R.: Mysteries of the Organism (1971)
She Done Him Wrong (1933)
Pickpocket (1959)
Belle de Jour (1967)

Publication history
The book was published by Random House, New York; it was re-printed in London by C.T. Editions with a new foreword and introduction by Scott MacDonald in 2005, and again in 2021 as a "remastered" edition by The Film Desk.

Film
A documentary film of the same name about Vogel and directed by Paul Cronin was released in 2003.

Bibliography

References

External links
The Subversive Nub

History of film
Books about film
1974 non-fiction books